The 1998 Speedway Grand Prix of Denmark was the third race of the 1998 Speedway Grand Prix season. It took place on 17 July in the Speedway Center in Vojens, Denmark It was the fourth Danish SGP and was won by Danish rider Hans Nielsen. It was the fifth win of his career.

Starting positions draw 

The Speedway Grand Prix Commission nominated Brian Karger (from Denmark), Antonín Kasper, Jr. (Czech Republic) and Lars Gunnestad (Norway) as Wild Card.

Heat details

The intermediate classification

See also 
 Speedway Grand Prix
 List of Speedway Grand Prix riders

References

External links 
 FIM-live.com
 SpeedwayWorld.tv

Ge
Speedway Grand Prix
Speedway Grand Prix
1998